Valdemārs is a Latvian masculine given name and surname and may refer to:

Given name 
Valdemārs Baumanis (1905–1992), Latvian basketball player, basketball and football coach
Valdemārs Klētnieks (1905–1968), Latvian writer and national Scout Commissioner for Latvia before World War II
Valdemārs Ozoliņš (1896–1973), Latvian composer and conductor

Surname 
Krišjānis Valdemārs (1825–1891), Latvian writer, editor, educator, politician, lexicographer, folklorist, and economist
Krišjānis Valdemārs, a Latvian icebreaker of the Ministry of Trade and Industry of the Republic of Latvia from 1926 to 1941

References

Masculine given names
Latvian masculine given names